12373 Lancearmstrong, provisional designation , is a bright Vestian asteroid from the inner regions of the asteroid belt, approximately  in diameter. It was discovered on 15 May 1994, by American astronomer and software engineer Charles de Saint-Aignan after examining films taken at Palomar Observatory, California, and named after American cyclist Lance Armstrong.

Orbital and physical characteristics 

The asteroid orbits the Sun in the inner main-belt at a distance of 2.2–2.7 AU once every 3 years and 10 months (1,401 days). Its orbit has an eccentricity of 0.11 and an inclination of 7° with respect to the ecliptic. The body's observation arc begins in 1994, as no precoveries were taken prior to its discovery.

Based on an absolute magnitude of 14.2 and an assumed albedo of 0.20, which is typical for bodies with a silicaceous composition, Lancearmstrong measures between 4 and 6 kilometers in diameter.

According to the survey carried out by NASA's Wide-field Infrared Survey Explorer with its subsequent NEOWISE mission, the asteroid measures 3.3 kilometers in diameter due to an unusually high albedo of 0.449. As of 2016, its composition, shape and rotation period and shape remains unknown.

Naming 

This minor planet was named after American Lance Armstrong (born 1971), former professional road racing cyclist. Despite being diagnosed with metastatic testicular cancer, he recovered and returned to cycling. At the time this minor planet was named, he had won the Tour de France three times and encouraged athletes and cancer survivors worldwide. The approved naming citation was published by the Minor Planet Center on 1 November 2001. In 2012, Armstrong was stripped of his Tour de France victories after a doping scandal.

See also 
 List of minor planets named after people
 List of exceptional asteroids
 Meanings of asteroid names –

References

External links 
 Asteroid Lightcurve Database (LCDB), query form (info )
 Dictionary of Minor Planet Names, Google books
 Asteroids and comets rotation curves, CdR – Observatoire de Genève, Raoul Behrend
 Discovery Circumstances: Numbered Minor Planets (10001)-(15000) – Minor Planet Center
 
 

012373
Discoveries by Charles de Saint-Aignan
Named minor planets
12373 Lancearmstrong
19940515